Daily Grand (also known as Grande vie in Quebec and Atlantic Canada) is a Canadian lottery game coordinated by the Interprovincial Lottery Corporation, as one of the country's three national lottery games, alongside Lotto 6/49 and Lotto Max. Sales began on October 18, 2016, and the first draw was held on October 20, 2016. The game was not launched in Atlantic Canada until 2017.

Winning numbers are chosen from five of 49 main numbers, and a "Grand Number" from 1 to 7. The Grand Number is drawn from a separate pool and may be equal to one of the five main numbers. It is matched separately for determining prize payouts.  A single board costs $3, and the game's top prize is an annuity of $1,000 a day (with a $7,000,000 lump sum option). Draws are held twice a week on Monday and Thursday nights.

Prize structure 

A lump sum option is available on the top two prizes, and is the only option if there are multiple winners. The annuity will last for the remainder of the winner's life, with a guaranteed period of 20 years (a beneficiary is chosen to receive the remainder of the 20-year minimum balance if the winner dies before the 20 years passes).

Promotion 
As part of a promotional effort for Daily Grand, the British Columbia Lottery Corporation announced a contest in which entrants would be asked how they would use the grand prize. The winners were to receive $1,000 prizes, and have to film themselves using the money.

See also 
 Powerball, a U.S. lottery game with a similar structure

References 

2016 establishments in Canada
Games and sports introduced in 2016
Lotteries in Canada